The Good Time Songs of Glen Campbell is a double album which consists of two previously released Pickwick albums A Satisfied Mind and The Glen Campbell Album.

Track listing
Side 1:

 "Only the Lonely" (Roy Orbison, Joe Melson) - 2:14
 "Same Old Places" (Glen Campbell) - 2:09
 "Woman's World" (W. T. Walker) - 2:10
 "Heartaches Can Be Fun" (Bare, Williams) - 1:50
 "Let Me Tell You 'Bout Mary" (B. Bare) - 2:05

Side 2:

 "Through The Eyes Of A Child" (Jerry Capehart, Glen Campbell) - 2:40
 "That's All Right" (A. Inman) - 2:18
 "Prima Donna" (Jerry Fuller) - 2:29
 "Can't You See I'm Tryin'" (Jerry Fuller, Glen Campbell)  -2:51

Side 3:

 "A Satisfied Mind" (J.H. Hayes, Jack Rhodes) - 2:01
 "Weary Lonesome Blues" (Alton Delmore) - 2:15
 "Truck Driving Man" (Terry Fell) - 2:00
 "There's More Pretty Girls Than One" (Alton Delmore, Arthur Smith) - 2:55
 "Rainin' On The Mountain" (Alton Delmore) - 2:22

Side 4:

 "One Hundred Miles Away From Home" (Jerry Capehart, Glen Campbell, Nick Venet) - 3:10
 "Kentucky Means Paradise" (Merle Travis) - 1:39
 "Lonesome Jailhouse Blues" (Alton Delmore, Rabon Delmore) - 1:32
 "Long Black Limousine" (Vern Stovall, Bobby George) - 3:00
 "Poor Boy Lookin' For A Home" (Melvin Schmidt) - 2:10

1973 compilation albums
Glen Campbell compilation albums